Patrícia Lúcia Saboya Ferreira Gomes (née Mendes; born 10 October 1962) is a Brazilian teacher, writer, and politician.

Biography
From 1983 to 1999, she was married to Ciro Gomes, her political ally and governor of Ceará from 1991 to 1994. They had three children together.

Her first elected position was as councilor of Fortaleza in 1996, standing as a candidate for the Brazilian Social Democracy Party (PSDB) and obtaining 21,839 votes. In 1998, she was elected to the Legislative Assembly of Ceará, now for the Popular Socialist Party (PPS), with 79,739 votes. In 2000, she ran for mayor of Fortaleza, finishing 4th with 17% of the votes.

In 2002, Saboya overcame objections within the PPS and ran for one of two vacancies in the Brazilian Senate. She was elected the first female senator for the State of Ceará, with 1,864,404 votes.

In 2005, she joined the Brazilian Socialist Party (PSB), but changed her affiliation again in September 2007 to the Democratic Labour Party (PDT), where she has remained.

In 2008, she ran again for mayor of Fortaleza, finishing in 3rd place with 15.47% of the votes.

As a senator, Saboya advocated for women's rights, and against the sexual exploitation of minors. She authored a bill to extend the parental leave law to six months.

In 2009, she took leave from the Senate to receive treatment for health problems, and was replaced by her first substitute, . She returned to her seat on 16 November 2009.

She was again elected state deputy of Ceará on 3 October 2010, when the PDT received the most votes, with 63,704.

Awards and honors
 Order of Naval Merit, 11 June 2005
 2005–2006 Woman of Struggles and Rights Award from the Instituto Municipalista Nacional
 Apvida Award, Ceará, May 2006
 Neide Castanha Award for the Human Rights of Children and Adolescents, 2011

Selected publications
 Construindo uma nova Perspectiva para Crianças e Adolescentes (2003), Brasilia
 Palavras e Idéias: Compromisso com a Infância e a Adolescência (2003), Brasilia
 Cartilha: Violência Sexual contra Meninos e Meninas (2004). Parliamentary Committee of Inquiry on Sexual Exploitation, Brasilia
 Esperança para as Crianças no Brasil. A CPMI da Exploração Sexual Apresenta seus Resultados (2004), Brasilia
 Protagonismo Social. Reflexões sobre Curso de Capacitação de Lideranças Comunitárias no Ceará (2004), Brasilia
 Infância e Parlamento: guia para formação de Frentes Parlamentares em defesa de crianças e adolescentes (2005), Brasilia
 Manual para Formação e Ação de Frentes Parlamentares em Defesa dos Direitos de Crianças e Adolescentes (2006), in cooperation with the Save the Children Institute of Sweden, Brasilia
 Frente Parlamentar em Defesa dos Direitos de Crianças e Adolescentes, uma Experiência Brasileira (2006), in cooperation with the Save the Children Institute of Sweden, Brasilia
 Os quatro primeiros anos no Senado. Pela infância, pelo Nordeste e por um Brasil melhor (2007), Brasilia

References

1962 births
Living people
People from Sobral, Ceará
Brazilian feminist writers
Brazilian non-fiction writers
Brazilian Social Democracy Party politicians
Brazilian Socialist Party politicians
Brazilian women's rights activists
Cidadania politicians
Democratic Labour Party (Brazil) politicians
Members of the Federal Senate (Brazil)
Members of the Legislative Assembly of Ceará
Recipients of the Order of Naval Merit (Brazil)
21st-century Brazilian women politicians
21st-century Brazilian women writers
21st-century Brazilian writers